The 2009 mayoral election in Jackson, Mississippi took place on June 2, 2009, alongside other Jackson municipal races. Former mayor Harvey Johnson, Jr. was elected after defeating councilman Marshand Crisler and incumbent mayor Frank Melton in the primary. Melton died on May 7, 2009, two days after not making the runoff in the Democratic primary.

Results

References

2009 United States mayoral elections
Mayoral elections in Jackson, Mississippi